The Group of 33 was an international grouping that existed briefly in 1999, comprising the thirty-three leading national economies of the world.

It superseded the Group of 22 in early 1999, and was itself superseded by the  Group of 20 later that year. A number of G33 meetings on the international financial system were held at the initiative of the finance ministers and central bank governors of the G7. The first meeting was held in Bonn, Germany in 1999.

References

Former international organizations
Intergovernmental organizations
Organizations established in 1999
Organizations disestablished in 1999

de:G33#Ehemalige G33 der Industrie- und Schwellenländer